Empire Theatre or Empire Theater may refer to:

Australia
Empire Theatre, Adelaide, former theatre and cinema in Grote Street, Adelaide, 1909–1948
Empire Theatre, Sydney, former musical theatre and cinema in New South Wales
Empire Theatre, Toowoomba, heritage-listed theatre in Queensland

Canada
Empire Theatres, former multiplex movie theatre chain

United Kingdom
 Empire Cinemas multiplex cinema chain with 14 locations and 131 screens
Empire Palace Theatre, later simply the Empire Theatre and now the Edinburgh Festival Theatre, Edinburgh
Empire Theatre of Varieties, now the Empire, Leicester Square, City of Westminster, London
Glasgow Empire Theatre, Glasgow
Hackney Empire, in Hackney
Liverpool Empire Theatre, Liverpool
Empire Theatre, Longton, former theatre and cinema in Staffordshire
New Empire Theatre, Southend-on-Sea
Sunderland Empire Theatre, Sunderland
Empire Cinema, Blackpool

United States
Empire Theater, now known as the Mainstreet Theater, Kansas City, Missouri
Empire Theatre (41st Street), former & now demolished Broadway theatre
Empire Theatre (42nd Street), former & now demolished Broadway theatre, was converted to the lobby of a movie theater
Empire Theatre (Rochester, New York)

See also
Empire Cinemas
Moss Empires, the company that owned many Empire Theatres in the United Kingdom